Canas or Cañas is a surname. Notable people with the surname include:

 Alberto Cañas Escalante, Costa Rican politician
 Antonio José Cañas, Salvadoran military officer, diplomat and politician
 Carlos Cañas, Salvadoran painter
 Guillermo Cañas, Argentinian professional tennis player
 Jorge Cañas, Salvadoran footballer
 José Cañas Ruiz-Herrera, Spanish footballer
 José María Cañas, Costa Rican military officer and politician
 José Marín Cañas, Costa Rican journalist and writer
 Juan José Cañas, co-author of the National Hymn of El Salvador
 Juan José Cañas Gutiérrez, former Spanish footballer
 Ricardo Moreno Cañas, Costa Rican politician
 Vicente Cañas, Spanish Christian missionary and Jesuit brother